Smyrna Township may refer to the following places in the United States:

 Smyrna Township, Pope County, Arkansas
 Smyrna Township, Jefferson County, Indiana
 Smyrna Township, Carteret County, North Carolina
 Smyrna Township, Robeson County, North Carolina

See also

Smyrna (disambiguation)

Township name disambiguation pages